(William) Greig Barr (b Glasgow 10 June 1917; d Oxford 23 April 2008) was an Oxford college head.

Barr was educated at Kelvinside Academy, Sedbergh School and Magdalen College, Oxford. He served in the Second World War with the Royal Devon Yeomanry. A historian, he was a Fellow of Exeter College, Oxford, from 1945 1972; and Rector of Exeter College, Oxford, from 1972 to 1982.

References

People educated at Kelvinside Academy
People educated at Sedbergh School
20th-century Scottish historians
Rectors of Exeter College, Oxford
Academics from Glasgow
1917 births
2008 deaths
Fellows of Exeter College, Oxford
Alumni of Magdalen College, Oxford
Royal Devon Yeomanry officers
British Army personnel of World War II
Military personnel from Glasgow